Robert Booth (born 26 March 1964) is an Australian rower. He competed in the men's coxless pair event at the 1984 Summer Olympics.

References

External links
 

1964 births
Living people
Australian male rowers
Olympic rowers of Australia
Rowers at the 1984 Summer Olympics
Place of birth missing (living people)